Fillièvres is a commune in the Pas-de-Calais department in the Hauts-de-France region of France.

Geography
A village situated some 20 miles (32 km) southeast of Montreuil-sur-Mer at the D340 road.

Population

Places of interest
 The sixteenth century church of Notre-Dame

See also
Communes of the Pas-de-Calais department

References

Communes of Pas-de-Calais
Artois